The 1992 NAIA Division I women's basketball tournament was the 12th annual tournament held by the NAIA to determine the national champion of women's college basketball among its members in the United States and Canada and the first held exclusively for the programs in its newly established Division I.

A separate tournament was held concurrently by the NAIA for the teams sorted into Division II. 

Arkansas Tech defeated Wayland Baptist in the championship game, 84–68, to claim the Golden Suns' first NAIA national title.

The tournament was played at the Oman Arena in Jackson, Tennessee.

Qualification

The tournament field expanded for the second time in its history, increasing from sixteen to thirty-two teams. The top sixteen teams received seeds. 

The tournament continue to utilize a simple single-elimination format.

Bracket

See also
1992 NAIA Division I men's basketball tournament
1992 NCAA Division I women's basketball tournament
1992 NCAA Division II women's basketball tournament
1992 NCAA Division III women's basketball tournament
1992 NAIA Division II women's basketball tournament

References

NAIA
NAIA Women's Basketball Championships
1992 in sports in Tennessee